Nick Carter is an American singer and a member of the vocal group Backstreet Boys His solo discography consists of three studio albums, one compilation album, eight singles (including one as a featured artist) and four music videos.

Carter attempted a career as a solo artist in 2002, when he released Now or Never. The album reached number 17 on the Billboard 200 and was certified gold, both in the United States and Canada. The lead single, "Help Me" achieved considerable worldwide success while the other single, "I Got You", was a minor hit in Europe.

Carter began work on his second solo album in 2003, but the recordings were aborted when the Backstreet Boys returned to the studio. One of the tracks from the earlier recording sessions was used as the theme song to the television series House of Carters in 2006. "Let It Go" was written by Nick Carter, Matthew Gerrard, and Bridget Louise Benenate.

Carter recorded a duet with pop singer Jennifer Paige called "Beautiful Lie" in 2009. In 2010, Nick Carter started recording new songs for his second solo album, working with Rami, Carl Falk, Toby Gad, Josh Hoge, Claude Kelly, and many others. The album, titled I'm Taking Off, was released in Japan on February 2, 2011, in Germany on June 3 and on the US iTunes Store on May 24.

Albums

Studio albums

Compilations

Singles

As lead artist

As featured artist

Other appearances
The following songs bonus, B-sides and have not appeared on album by Nick Carter.

 "European Girls"
 "Don't Walk Away"
 "End of Forever"
 "Love to Love" (Backstreet Boys)
 "Not Like You"
 "Payback"
 "Rockstar Baby"
 "What More Can I Give" (with the All Stars) 
 "There for Me" (with Melissa Schuman)
 "Let It Go" (from House of Carters)
 "Funny Face"
 "No More Games" (from Kill Speed)
 "Scream"
 "Prisoner"
 "I Gotta Get with You"
 "Forever Rebel"

Music videos

Notes

References

External links
Discography of Nick Carter at NickCarter.com
[ Discography of Nick Carter] at AllMusic

Discographies of American artists
Pop music discographies
Nick Carter (musician)